Bernard Allen (born 9 September 1944) is a former Irish Fine Gael politician. He served as a Teachta Dála (TD) for the Cork North-Central constituency from 1981 to 2011.

Allen was born in Cork city. He was educated at the North Monastery Christian Brothers School and University College Cork where he qualified with a diploma in Chemical Technology. Allen first became involved in politics in 1979 when he was elected to Cork Corporation, and was a member until 1995. He was first elected to Dáil Éireann at the 1981 general election as a Fine Gael TD for the Cork North-Central constituency and retained his seat at each subsequent general election until his retirement in 2011. At the 1987 general election Fine Gael lost power and Allen was appointed opposition spokesperson for Health. The following year he became Lord Mayor of Cork. In 1993 Allen became spokesperson for Social Welfare.

In 1994 Fine Gael returned to government and Taoiseach John Bruton appointed Allen as Minister of State at the Department of Education with special responsibility for Youth and Sport and at the Department of the Environment with special responsibility for local government reform. In February 2002 Michael Noonan became leader of Fine Gael and Allen was appointed spokesperson for Tourism, Sport and Recreation. Following the 2002 general election Allen was one of the few high-profile Fine Gael TDs who were re-elected. Following this he was appointed opposition spokesperson for the Environment and Local Government under the new leader Enda Kenny. From 2004 to 2007, Allen was opposition spokesperson for Foreign Affairs and chairman of the Dáil sub-committee on European Affairs. From 2007 to 2011, he was chairman of the Dáil Public Accounts Committee.

He retired from politics at the 2011 general election. As of 2019, he is a member of the board of Sport Ireland.

He is married to Marie Dorney and they have three daughters.

References

 

1944 births
People from Cork (city)
Alumni of University College Cork
Politicians from County Cork
Local councillors in Cork (city)
Fine Gael TDs
Lord Mayors of Cork
Members of the 22nd Dáil
Members of the 23rd Dáil
Members of the 24th Dáil
Members of the 25th Dáil
Members of the 26th Dáil
Members of the 27th Dáil
Members of the 28th Dáil
Members of the 29th Dáil
Members of the 30th Dáil
Ministers of State of the 27th Dáil
Sport Ireland officials
Living people